Macroperipatus clarki is a species of velvet worm in the Peripatidae family. This species has 34 to 36 pairs of legs. The type locality is in Jamaica.

References

Onychophorans of tropical America
Onychophoran species
Animals described in 1961